Alfredectes semiaeneus, or Alfred's shieldback, is a species of katydid that is widespread in the Western Cape and Eastern Cape of South Africa. It is found in lowland and coastal fynbos, up to 1400 m elevation. It is threatened with habitat destruction, but can be found in protected areas such as Baviaanskloof Mega Reserve and Tsitsikamma National Park.

References

Tettigoniinae
Endemic insects of South Africa
Insects described in 1838